Louis Behrens was the Chief of the fire department of Charleston, South Carolina for 25 years. He worked for the department for 58 years.

Behrens grew up in Charleston, and grew up to become a cabinet maker.  His uncle had been a firefighter and had died fighting fires when Union forces bombarded Charleston during the Civil War.

Behrens had a training assignment with the Fire Department of New York.

Legacy

Charleston named a fireboat after Behrens in 2012.

References

1860 births
1932 deaths
American fire chiefs